The men's 400 metres hurdles at the 2018 European Athletics Championships took place at the Olympic Stadium on 6, 7 and 9 August.

Records

Schedule

Results

Round 1
First 2 in each heat (Q) and the next fastest 5 (q) advance to the Semifinals. 11 fastest entrants awarded bye to Semifinals.

Semifinals
First 2 (Q) and next 2 fastest (q) qualify for the final.

Final

References

Hurdles 400 M
400 metres hurdles at the European Athletics Championships